Otto "Ott" Heller (born 30 November 1914, date of death unknown) was a Swiss ice hockey player who competed for the Swiss national team at the 1936 Winter Olympics in Garmisch-Partenkirchen.

References

External links
Otto Heller statistics at Sports-Reference.com

1914 births
Ice hockey players at the 1936 Winter Olympics
Olympic ice hockey players of Switzerland
Year of death missing
Swiss ice hockey centres